Scott Russell Sanders (born October 26, 1945 in Memphis, Tennessee) is an American novelist and essayist.

Sanders has won acclaim for his skill as a personal essayist.  A contributing editor for Orion magazine, he has won the John Burroughs Natural History Essay Award, the Indiana Authors Award, and the Mark Twain Award, among other honors. A frequent public lecturer, Sanders also conducts writing workshops across the United States, including recent ones in Alaska, Vermont, Massachusetts, Oregon, and New Mexico.  He received the Lannan Literary Award in 1995 for his non-fiction writing, and has received the Frederic Bachman Lieber Award for Distinguished Teaching, the highest teaching award given at Indiana University. In 2012 he was elected to the American Academy of Arts and Sciences. Sanders was a judge for the 2016 Permafrost Book Prize in Nonfiction for Permafrost: Literary Journal.

Sanders was a distinguished professor of English at Indiana University, where he taught from 1971 until his retirement in 2009. During his career, he has spent sabbatical years as a writer-in-residence at Phillips Exeter Academy, and as a Visiting Professor at University of Oregon, MIT, and Beloit College.  He is married with two children, Eva and Jesse, both of whom he addresses in letters included in The Force of Spirit.

He and his wife, Ruth, a biochemist, live in Bloomington, Indiana, in the watershed of the White River.

Works

Fiction

Novels
 Terrarium (1985) 
 Bad Man Ballad (1986) 
 The Engineer of Beasts (1986) 
 The Invisible Company (1989) 
 Divine Animal (2014)

Short Story Collections
 Wilderness Plots (1983) 
 Fetching the Dead (1984)
 Dancing in Dreamtime (2016)

Creative non-fiction/essays
“Scott: Towards a Social Theory of Literature”. Telos 18 (Winter 1973-74). New York: Telos Press.
 The Paradise of Bombs (1987) 
 In Limestone Country (1991)
 Secrets of the Universe: Scenes from the Journey Home (1991) 
 Staying Put: Making a Home in a Restless World (1993) 
 Writing from the Center (1995) 
 Hunting for Hope: A Father's Journeys (1998) 
 The Country of Language (1999) 
 The Force of Spirit (2000) 
 A Private History of Awe (2006) 
 A Conservationist Manifesto (2009) 
 Earth Works: Selected Essays (2012) 
 Stone Country: Then and Now  (2017) 
 The Way of Imagination: Essays (2020)

Children's books
 Hear the Wind Blow (1985) 
 Aurora Means Dawn (1989) 
 Warm as Wool (1992) 
 Here Comes the Mystery Man (1993) 
 Floating House (1995) 
 Meeting Trees (1996) 
 A Place Called Freedom (1997) 
 Crawdad Creek (1999)

Honors
Marshall Scholarship
Guggenheim Fellowship
Lannan Literary Award in Nonfiction
National Endowment for the Arts Fellowship in Creative Writing
Associated Writers and Writing Programs Award in Creative Nonfiction
Ohioana Book Award in Nonfiction for Staying Put
Great Lakes Book Award in Nonfiction for Writing from the Center
Indiana Authors Award, National Winner
Mark Twain Award from Society for the Study of Midwestern Literature
Cecil Woods, Jr. Award for Nonfiction from the Fellowship of Southern Writers

References
http://www.scottrussellsanders.com/biog.html
https://web.archive.org/web/20080514155327/http://www.kenyonreview.org/interviews/sanders.php

External links 
Scott Russell Sanders official Web site
Scott Russell Sanders Faculty Profile at Indiana University
Sanders, Scott Russell mss., ca. 1966-2009 at the Indiana University Lilly Library.
Scott R. Sanders teaching and faculty files, 1971-2009, bulk 1989-2009 at the Indiana University Archives.

1945 births
Living people
Beloit College faculty
Fellows of the American Academy of Arts and Sciences
Writers from Memphis, Tennessee